Arierang is the Dutch association for Korean Adoptees in the Netherlands.

International adoption of South Korean children to the Netherlands exists since 1967. Since then until 2003, 4,099 children have been adopted from South Korea to Dutch parents in the Netherlands.

Arierang was founded in 1991 and the bylaws have been filed on May 28, 1993. Arierang is a founding member and part of International Korean Adoptee Associations (IKAA).

Members of Arierang are adopted from the Republic of Korea, living in the Netherlands and older than 16 years.
Activities are frequently organised for and by the members on a volunteer basis such as the Arierang Weekend and social events in Amsterdam on a monthly basis.
The association publishes a member magazine, Uri Shinmun (='Our Newspaper').
Furthermore, Arierang hosts events and shares information about Korean culture, language, food, traveling and adoption.

Arierang strives to maintain good relationships with the Korean society in the Netherlands and the embassy of the Republic of Korea.

In 2009 Arierang hosted the IKAA Gathering in Amsterdam. An event for over 140 Korean adoptees from 9 countries.

External links 
 Arierang, vereniging voor Koreaans geadopteerden
 IKAA, International Korean Adoptee Associations

References

Adoption in the Netherlands
South Korean adoptees